Mount Robertson is a mountain (1,565 m) standing 20 nautical miles (37 km) northwest of Mount Austin and the head of Gardner Inlet, on the east coast of Palmer Land. It was discovered by the Ronne Antarctic Research Expedition (RARE), 1947–48, under Ronne, who named this feature for James B. Robertson, aviation mechanic with the expedition.

Mountains of Palmer Land